Moerman is a Dutch surname. Moer was the name for a bog where peat was harvested. A moerman could have referred to a peat harvester or trader, or a person living near such a region. Notable people with this surname include:

Adrien Moerman (born 1988), French basketball player
 (1893–1988), Dutch physician
Moerman Therapy, a diet he claimed to be a cancer treatment
Daniel Moerman (born 1941), American medical anthropologist
Ernst Moerman (1897–1944), Belgian writer and film director
Fientje Moerman (born 1958), Belgian liberal politician
 (1936–2010), Belgian-born French gypsy jazz guitarist
Gerben Moerman, (born 1959) Dutch sociologist
 (1850–1896), Belgian genre painter 
Jean-Paul Moerman (born 1952), Belgian Walloon politician
Joren Moerman, Flemish director

See also
 Moorman (disambiguation)
 Morman
 Mormon (disambiguation)
 Murman (disambiguation)

References

Dutch-language surnames
Occupational surnames